Mohammed Kazem Tabataba'i Yazdi (1831–1919) was a Twelver Shia Marja' based in Najaf, most famous for compiling a collection of religious rulings, al-Urwa al-wuthqa.

Constitutional Revolution
He was apolitical, and therefore during the Iranian Constitutional Revolution, he stayed neutral most of the times and seldom issued any political statement. Contrary to Akhund Khorasani, he thought that Usulism did not offer the liberty to support constitutional politics. In his view, politics was beyond his expertise and therefore he avoided taking part in it.  While Akhund Khorasani was an eminent Marja' in Najaf, many imitators prayed behind Kazim Yazdi too, as his lesson on rulings (figh) was famous. In other words both Mohammad Kazem and Khorasani had constituted a great Shia school in Najaf although they had different views in politics at the same time. However, he was not fully supportive of the King Muhammad Ali Shah Qajar or Fazlullah Nouri, despite their efforts he didn't fully support them. Therefore, when parliament asked him to review the final draft of constitution, he suggested some changes and signed the document. He said that modern industries were permissible unless explicitly prohibited by Sharia. He also agreed with teaching of modern sciences, and added that the state should not intervene in the centers of religious learning (Hawza). He wasn't against formation of organizations and societies that do not create chaos, and in this regard there was no difference between religious and non-religious organizations. In law-making, unlike Nouri, he separated the religious (Sharia) and public law (Urfiya). His opinion was that the personal and family matters should be settled in religious courts by jurists, and the governmental affaris and matters of state should be taken care of by modern judiciary. Parliament added article 71 and 72 into the constitution based on his opinions. Ayatullah Yazdi said that as long as modern democratic constitution did not force people to do what was forbidden by Sharia and refrain from religious duties, there was no reason to oppose democratic reform, and the government had the right to prosecute wrong doers.

Works
One of his important books is Urwa al-Wuthqa (Orwatul Wosgha). This book which is in Arabic is to a collection of legal ruling issued in 1919.

See also
Iranian Constitutional Revolution
Muhammad Kazim Khurasani
Mirza Husayn Tehrani
Abdullah Mazandarani
Muhammad Husayn Na'ini
Mirza Ali Aqa Tabrizi
Fazlullah Nouri
Urwatul Wuthqa

Bibliography 

The Turban for the Crown: The Islamic Revolution in Iran By Said Amir Arjomand
Mottahedeh, Roy, The Mantle of the Prophet : Religion and Politics in Iran, One World, Oxford, 1985, 2000

References

Iranian ayatollahs
20th-century Iranian politicians
People of the Persian Constitutional Revolution
1831 births
1919 deaths
Burials at Imam Ali Mosque
Hashemite people
19th-century Iranian politicians